Alfredo Olivas (born October 1, 1994, in Ciudad Obregón, Sonora, Mexico) is a Regional Mexican singer-songwriter, specializing in the styles of banda, pacific norteño, norteño-banda, and mariachi. He is popularly known as "Alfredito", "Alfredito Olivas" (little Alfredo) or "el Patroncito" (after a song on the eponymous album El Patroncito, 2011).

Career
Since the age of 9, Alfredo Olivas has written over 1,000 songs and released dozens of singles on independent labels. He signed to Fonovisa Records at the age of 16, releasing El Patroncito (his first solo album) in 2011. In 2014, Olivas moved to Sony's imprint Sahuaro Music. His most recent album, El Privilegio, was released in January 2015 [2]. A song from that album, "Mi Porvenir", was included in Billboard's chart highlights in the Mexican Regional Music category. The album charted in the number two spot on Billboard's Top Latin Albums (January 29, 2015), and also reached a peak position of number 2 on Billboard's Top Regional Mexican Albums chart. The song "Mi Porvenir" spent two weeks at #30 for Regional Mexican airplay, with a peak of #26. For the week of March 29, 2015, El Privilegio ranked #61 on the iTunes Top 100 Latin Albums chart.

One of his most popular corridos is "Las Vacaciones del Jefe", (The Boss's Vacation) which is included on El Patroncito, as well as on two compilation albums. This song begins with the line, "Yo no he matado a nadie... ultimamente," (I haven't killed anyone... lately). The related video received hundreds of thousands of hits on YouTube. The song reached a peak of #31 on Billboard's Regional Mexican Airplay chart.

Olivas has composed songs for several notable bands. Los Cuates de Sinaloa recorded Olivas' song "Tocando with the Mafia", which peaked at number 13 on Billboard's Top Regional Mexican Albums in 2011.

Olivas' most recent work moves away from the narcocorrido. He says that cartel violence in Mexico and the birth of his first child have motivated him to create more positive music, in a style known as "Norteña Romantica".

He has two solo albums, and many of his songs are included in several compilation albums, which are all collections of narcocorridos.

Shooting
On February 28, 2015, at the age of 20, Alfredo Olivas was shot eight times while performing on stage in Hidalgo del Parral, Chihuahua, México. Olivas was singing the song "Asi es esto", and bent down to toss his jacket to a female fan. The woman's boyfriend and two companions drew guns, firing twenty-four rounds. Olivas and several other men standing in the VIP section in front of the stage were hit. Olivas survived, but two of the other men shot in the incident died from his injuries shortly after. Three gunmen were arrested. The motivation for the shooting may have been jealousy. An audience member captured video of the shooting and later posted it to YouTube.

The city of Chihuahua has banned the performance of narcocorridos as a result of the shootings at Olivas' concert.

Discography

Solo albums
 El Privilegio (released January 20, 2015, by Sahuaro Enterprise, Inc., an imprint of Sony Records)
 El Patroncito (released January 11, 2011, by Fonovisa Records)

Compilations
 20 Corridos Bien Perrones (released August 5, 2014, by Fonovisa)
 Club Corridos: Corridos de Combate (released February 19, 2014, by SonoraMX)
 Club Corridos: Sinaloa Rifa! (released January 13, 2014, by Hyphy Music)
 Corridos #1 (released January 10, 2012, by Disa Latin Music/UMG Recordings Inc.)

References

External links 
 Alfredo Olivas: El Rey de la Pluma (cover story, Triunfo Magazine, issue 95, January 15, 2015)

1994 births
Living people
People from Ciudad Obregón
Musicians from Sonora
21st-century Mexican singers
21st-century Mexican male singers
Universal Music Latin Entertainment artists